SS St. Albans Victory  was a Victory ship cargo ship built for the U.S. Maritime Commission during the final months of World War II. She was converted to be a troop ship.

Victory built in Maryland
Smith Victory under Maritime Commission contract by Bethlehem Fairfield Shipyard, Inc., Baltimore, Maryland; laid down on 20 July 1944, launched on 5 October 1944, completed on 9 November 1944 and delivered to her operator, American West African Lines.

Service

SS St. Albans Victory was christened before sliding into the Patapsco River near Baltimore, Maryland. The St. Albans Victory was built by the Bethlehem-Fairfield Shipyard. The Bethlehem-Fairfield Shipyard employed 47,000 people. Smith Victory could carry 10,800 tons of supplies or 1,500 troops at a top speed of 15 knots. St. Albans Victory was converted to a troopship and used to bring troops home as part of Operation Magic Carpet. St. Albans Victory was operated by American West African Lines. The St. Albans Victory returned about 7,000 troops. In 1947 she was laid up in the James River Reserve Fleet. In 1949 St. Albans Victory was sold to China Union Lines of Shanghai, (later Taiwan) and renamed the SS Shanghai. In 1951 she was sold to the Argosy Steamship Company of Panama and renamed SS Hafez. In 1953 she was sold to HO, Korea Shipping Corporation of Republic of Korea and renamed SS Nam Hae Ho.  In 1954 she was renamed SS Namhae. On December 18, 1972, she ran aground in Pusan Harbour and broke in two. She was a total loss and was scrapped.

See also 
 
 
 List of Victory ships
 Liberty ship
 Type C1 ship
 Type C2 ship
 Type C3 ship

References

Victory ships
Ships built in Baltimore
1944 ships
World War II merchant ships of the United States